{{DISPLAYTITLE:Rhaetian Railway Ge 4/4 I}}

The Rhaetian Railway Ge 4/4 I is a class of metre gauge Bo′Bo′ electric locomotives operated by the Rhaetian Railway (RhB), which is the main railway network in the Canton of Graubünden, Switzerland.

The class is so named because it was the first class of locomotives of the Swiss locomotive and railcar classification type Ge 4/4 to be acquired by the Rhaetian Railway. According to that type designation, Ge 4/4 denotes a narrow gauge electric adhesion locomotive with a total of four axles, all of which are drive axles.

The 10 machines in the Ge 4/4 I class were also the first RhB electric locomotives without rod drive.

History 

In 1944, the Rhaetian Railway ordered four Ge 4/4 I class locomotives from the Swiss Locomotive and Machine Works (SLM).  The first of these machines was commissioned in July 1947.  In service primarily in the haulage of fast trains, they proved themselves so well that in 1953 the Rhaetian Railway ordered six further examples.

The later entry into service of the Ge 6/6 II and the Ge 4/4 II class locomotives led to the cascading of the Ge 4/4 I class into lesser responsibilities.

Between 1986 and 1991, the Ge 4/4 I class was completely modernised.  For example, the old cab fronts with their communication doors were replaced with new cab fronts.  Since their modernisation, the locomotives in the class have continued to render loyal service to the Rhaetian Railway right up to today.

Specifications 

Beginning in 1997, the Ge 4/4 I class's old diamond-shaped pantographs were replaced by new single-arm pantographs, to enable deployment of the class on the Chur-Arosa line, which at that time was having its electrification system changed.

The names of the 10 locomotives in the class commemorate the names of certain valleys, mountains and mountain ranges in Graubünden.  The names are located high on the left and right sides of the locomotives, in white script on a red background.  The service numbers 601–610 are on both cab ends, and also on the lower sides.

Current operations 
An important present day area of operation for the Ge 4/4 I class is the Rhaetian Railway line from Davos to Filisur, with its many tunnels.  Since December 2004, the class has operated three car push-pull trains, consisting of a Steuerwagen BDt 172x, an Einheitswagen I B and an Einheitswagen III A, on this line.  Previously, modernised centre entry cars were used on these services.  Between Davos and Filisur, the introduction of the push pull trains has reduced the operating requirement to one consist of cars, instead of the two sets that were previously required.

In winter, the Ge 4/4 I class also hauls the Bergün-Preda-Bergün toboggan trains, and a few other wintersport trains in Prättigau.

Disposal and Preservation 
During November 2010, the Rhaetian Railways began taking most of the locomotives of this series after more than 50 years of service, most were disposed of and scrapped, which included Ge 4/4I's 601/604/606/608/609, however four remain to this day, but however two are still in operation with Rhaetain Railways, 605 and 610.

While at a time of withdrawal commenced, two were saved in heritage collection, 602 named "Bernina" was passed on March 7, 2012 to the Museum of Transport, in Lucerne (five-year loan) and later returned to Landquart for service again, while 603 "Badus" was destined to be preserved and brought to the Museum Augsburg Railway Park in Germany but however the plan to send her fell through, however the Rhb Historic have plans to save No. 602 "Bernina" for preservation along with 610 "Viamala", 610 is to go to the Club 1889 upon withdrawal and will be restored to her original condition.

List of locomotives 
The following locomotives in the class have served on the Rhaetian Railway:

See also 

 History of rail transport in Switzerland
 Rail transport in Switzerland

References

Further reading 

 
 
 

This article is based upon a translation of the German language version as at January 2010.

SLM locomotives
Brown, Boveri & Cie locomotives
Bo′Bo′ locomotives
Electric locomotives of Switzerland
11 kV AC locomotives
Rhaetian Railway locomotives
Railway locomotives introduced in 1947
Metre gauge electric locomotives

ja:レーティッシュ鉄道Ge4/4 II形電気機関車